The 1896 Princeton Tigers football team was an American football team that represented Princeton University as an independent during the 1896 college football season. The team finished with a 10–0–1 record, shut out 10 of 12 opponents, and outscored all opponents by a total of 266 to 5. Franklin Morse was the head coach, and Garrett Cochran was the team captain.

There was no contemporaneous system in 1896 for determining a national champion. However, Princeton was retroactively named as the national champion by the Billingsley Report, Helms Athletic Foundation, and Houlgate System, and as a co-national champion with Lafayette by the National Championship Foundation (NCF) and Parke H. Davis. In head-to-head competition, Princeton and Lafayette played to a scoreless tie on October 7, 1896.

Four Princeton players were selected as consensus first-team players on the 1896 All-America team: halfback Addison Kelly; fullback John Baird; center Robert Gailey; and tackle William W. Church. Other notable players included quarterback F. L. Smith, halfback William Bannard, end Garrett Cochran, and guard Edward Crowdis.

Schedule

References

Princeton
Princeton Tigers football seasons
College football national champions
College football undefeated seasons
Princeton Tigers football